Jefferson Female Seminary, also known as Jefferson Female College, are two historic school buildings located at Jefferson City, Cole County, Missouri, USA. They were built between 1884 and 1898 and are adjacent two-story, five bay brick buildings.  They have both front and rear porches and hipped roofs. The school closed in 1898 and the buildings have been used for residential purposes since 1900.

It was listed on the National Register of Historic Places in 2000. It is located in the Capitol Avenue Historic District.

References

Individually listed contributing properties to historic districts on the National Register in Missouri
School buildings on the National Register of Historic Places in Missouri
Residential buildings on the National Register of Historic Places in Missouri
School buildings completed in 1898
Buildings and structures in Jefferson City, Missouri
National Register of Historic Places in Cole County, Missouri
History of women in Missouri